Darren Cullen may refer to:
 Darren Cullen (artist / activist), British artist and political cartoonist
 Darren Cullen (graffiti artist), British graffiti artist